Pharmacy Records is an independent record label based in Melbourne, Australia, and run by Richard Andrew of Registered Nurse.

Pharmacy Records is distributed through MGM Distribution in Australia and through Narwhal Records in the UK.

Notable artists
 Black Cab
 The Fergs
 Grand Salvo
 Mississippi Barry
 Registered Nurse
 Silver Ray
 Princess One Point Five
 Tugboat
 Diving Bell

See also 
 List of record labels

External links
 Official site
 AMO Record Label profile

Pharmacy Records
Indie rock record labels